"Fire Meet Gasoline" is a song recorded by Australian singer and songwriter Sia for her sixth studio album, 1000 Forms of Fear (2014). It was written by Sia, Greg Kurstin and Samuel Dixon. Kurstin also produced the song. It was released in Germany on 19 June 2015 as the album's fourth and final single.

Music video 
The music video was released on 23 April 2015 on YouTube. It was filmed for Heidi Klum's lingerie line, and stars Klum and Game of Thrones actor Pedro Pascal as a couple in the throes of a dramatic relationship. Somewhere in the middle of the video, Klum's character sets their home on fire and together they watch it burn by its end. Sia never appears in the visual, but her blonde wig does. Sia herself was not involved with the shooting of the video, which was directed by Francesco Carrozzini. Although it was believed that she would release a new single, the singer said: "Fire Meet Gasoline is not an official music video, nor is it my new single. It's a lingerie commercial to which I licensed a song."

Klum said she was "thrilled" to have Sia's song in her video. "Sia is one of those incredible artists who puts so much passion into her work, and I am thrilled to be part of a music video," Klum said in a statement. "I remember being blown away the first time I heard her voice on 'Breathe Me'. And I love many songs she has written for other artists. I love great collaborations and to be given the opportunity to appear in the video while wearing my Heidi Klum Intimates collection, is definitely up there."

Formats 
CD single
"Fire Meet Gasoline" – 4:02
"Big Girls Cry" – (Bleachers Remix) – 4:05

Charts

Weekly charts

Year-end charts

Release history

References

External links

2010s ballads
2014 songs
2015 singles
Electropop ballads
Sia (musician) songs
Song recordings produced by Greg Kurstin
Songs written by Greg Kurstin
Songs written by Sia (musician)
Songs written by Samuel Dixon
Synth-pop ballads